This page shows the electron configurations of the neutral gaseous atoms in their ground states. For each atom the subshells are given first in concise form, then with all subshells written out, followed by the number of electrons per shell. Electron configurations of elements beyond hassium (element 108) have never been measured; predictions are used below.

As an approximate rule, electron configurations are given by the Aufbau principle and the Madelung rule.

Note that these electron configurations are given for neutral atoms in the gas phase, which are not the same as the electron configurations for the same atoms in chemical environments. In many cases, multiple configurations are within a small range of energies and the irregularities shown below do not necessarily have a clear relation to chemical behaviour. For the undiscovered eighth-row elements, mixing of configurations is expected to be very important, and sometimes the result can no longer be well-described by a single configuration.

See also
Extended periodic table#Electron configurations – Predictions for undiscovered elements 119–173 and 184

References

All sources concur with the data above except in the instances listed separately:

NIST
http://physics.nist.gov/PhysRefData/IonEnergy/ionEnergy.html ; retrieved July 2005, (elements 1–104) based on:
Atomic Spectroscopy, by W.C. Martin and W.L. Wiese in Atomic, Molecular, & Optical Physics Handbook, ed. by G.W.F. Drake (AIP, Woodbury, NY, 1996) Chapter 10, pp. 135–153.
This website is also cited in the CRC Handbook as source of Section 1, subsection Electron Configuration of Neutral Atoms in the Ground State.

91 Pa : [Rn] 5f2(3H4) 6d 7s2
92 U : [Rn] 5f3(4Io9/2) 6d 7s2
93 Np : [Rn] 5f4(5I4) 6d 7s2
103 Lr : [Rn] 5f14 7s2 7p1 question-marked
104 Rf : [Rn] 5f14 6d2 7s2 question-marked

CRC
David R. Lide (ed), CRC Handbook of Chemistry and Physics, 84th Edition, online version. CRC Press. Boca Raton, Florida, 2003; Section 1, Basic Constants, Units, and Conversion Factors; Electron Configuration of Neutral Atoms in the Ground State. (elements 1–104)
Also subsection Periodic Table of the Elements, (elements 1–103) based on:
G. J. Leigh, Editor, Nomenclature of Inorganic Chemistry, Blackwell Scientific Publications, Oxford, 1990.
Chemical and Engineering News, 63(5), 27, 1985.
Atomic Weights of the Elements, 1999, Pure Appl. Chem., 73, 667, 2001.

WebElements
http://www.webelements.com/ ; retrieved July 2005, electron configurations based on:
Atomic, Molecular, & Optical Physics Handbook, Ed. Gordon W. F. Drake, American Institute of Physics, Woodbury, New York, 1996.
J.E. Huheey, E.A. Keiter, and R.L. Keiter in Inorganic Chemistry : Principles of Structure and Reactivity, 4th edition, Harper Collins, New York, 1993.
R.L. DeKock and H.B. Gray in Chemical Structure and bonding, Benjamin/Cummings, Menlo Park, California, 1980.
A.M. James and M.P. Lord in Macmillan's Chemical and Physical Data, Macmillan, London, UK, 1992.
103 Lr : [Rn].5f14.7s2.7p1 tentative ; 2.8.18.32.32.9.2 [inconsistent]
104 Rf : [Rn].5f14.6d2.7s2 tentative
105 Db : [Rn].5f14.6d3.7s2 (a guess based upon that of tantalum) ; 2.8.18.32.32.11.2
106 Sg : [Rn].5f14.6d4.7s2 (a guess based upon that of tungsten) ; 2.8.18.32.32.12.2
107 Bh : [Rn].5f14.6d5.7s2 (a guess based upon that of rhenium) ; 2.8.18.32.32.13.2
108 Hs : [Rn].5f14.6d6.7s2 (a guess based upon that of osmium) ; 2.8.18.32.32.14.2
109 Mt : [Rn].5f14.6d7.7s2 (a guess based upon that of iridium) ; 2.8.18.32.32.15.2
110 Ds : [Rn].5f14.6d9.7s1 (a guess based upon that of platinum) ; 2.8.18.32.32.17.1
111 Rg : [Rn].5f14.6d10.7s1 (a guess based upon that of gold) ; 2.8.18.32.32.18.1
112 Cn : [Rn].5f14.6d10.7s2 (a guess based upon that of mercury) ; 2.8.18.32.32.18.2
113 Nh : [Rn].5f14.6d10.7s2.7p1 (a guess based upon that of thallium) ; 2.8.18.32.32.18.3
114 Fl : [Rn].5f14.6d10.7s2.7p2 (a guess based upon that of lead) ; 2.8.18.32.32.18.4
115 Mc : [Rn].5f14.6d10.7s2.7p3 (a guess based upon that of bismuth) ; 2.8.18.32.32.18.5
116 Lv : [Rn].5f14.6d10.7s2.7p4 (a guess based upon that of polonium) ; 2.8.18.32.32.18.6
117 Ts : [Rn].5f14.6d10.7s2.7p5 (a guess based upon that of astatine) ; 2.8.18.32.32.18.7
118 Og : [Rn].5f14.6d10.7s2.7p6 (a guess based upon that of radon) ; 2.8.18.32.32.18.8

Lange
J.A. Dean (ed), Lange's Handbook of Chemistry (15th Edition), online version, McGraw-Hill, 1999; Section 4, Table 4.1 Electronic Configuration and Properties of the Elements. (Elements 1–103)
97 Bk : [Rn] 5f8 6d 7s2
103 Lr : [Rn] 4f14 [sic] 6d 7s2

Hill and Petrucci
Hill and Petrucci, General Chemistry: An Integrated Approach (3rd edition), Prentice Hall. (Elements 1–106)
58 Ce : [Xe] 4f2 6s2
103 Lr : [Rn] 5f14 6d1 7s2
104 Rf : [Rn] 5f14 6d2 7s2 (agrees with guess above)
105 Db : [Rn] 5f14 6d3 7s2
106 Sg : [Rn] 5f14 6d4 7s2

Hoffman, Lee, and Pershina

This book contains predicted electron configurations for the elements up to 172, as well as 184, based on relativistic Dirac–Fock calculations by B. Fricke in 

Chemical element data pages